Rich Ceisler (March 1, 1956 – August 4, 2014) was an American stand-up comedian, author, and director.

Early life and education
Ceisler attended State University of New York Fredonia, studying Theater Arts.  He later pursued graduate studies at Virginia Tech, where he obtained a master's degree in theater.

Death
In August 2014, Ceisler died at Santiago, Dominican Republic at the age of 58 from Guillain–Barré syndrome. He had contracted a rare illness two weeks before he died.

References

External links
 Official Website of Rich Ceisler
 State University of New York at Fredonia Alumni
 Entertainment Resources  Rich Ceisler
 Rich Ceisler's Australia experience Nick Zaino's interview.

2014 deaths
1950s births
American stand-up comedians
People with Guillain–Barré syndrome